Mick Wingert  is an American voice actor. He is known for his role as the voice of Master Po and Zeng in Kung Fu Panda: Legends of Awesomeness, taking over the roles from actors Jack Black and Dan Fogler, respectively; as well as Iron Man in various Marvel productions. He also does additional voice-over work in Kung Fu Panda, Mass Effect 2, Murdered: Soul Suspect, The Technomancer, The Princess and the Frog, and The NoSleep Podcast.

He is not related to fellow voice actor Wally Wingert.

Career
Wingert has been working as a voice actor since 2004 and became a transplant to Southern California that same year. He studied theater and mass communication at California State University and began working as a voice actor for local and regional advertising. He voiced Ludwig in The Cuphead Show!

Wingert voiced Po in the TV show Kung Fu Panda: Legends of Awesomeness. Wingert has been praised by Kung Fu Panda fans for his accurate impression of Jack Black. He is also the voice of Po in the Kung Fu Panda video games and Kung Fu Panda: The Paws of Destiny.

Wingert has worked as a voice actor in The Princess and the Frog as additional voices and The Avengers: Earth's Mightiest Heroes as the A.I. for Beta Ray Bill's ship Skuttlebutt. Wingert was also cast in other video games, like Mass Effect 2 (as well as in hundreds of radio commercials in Southern California and on TV commercials across the country).

Recently, Wingert has voiced Iron Man / Tony Stark for the Avengers Assemble animated series, replacing Adrian Pasdar. He has since reprised the role in Marvel: Contest of Champions, Lego Marvel Super Heroes: Avengers Reassembled, Marvel Super Hero Adventures: Frost Fight!, Lego Marvel Super Heroes - Black Panther: Trouble in Wakanda, Marvel Future Avengers, Marvel Rising, Guardians of the Galaxy and Spider-Man. He also voices the character's MCU version in What If...?

Filmography

Film

Anime

Animation

Theme Park Attractions

Video games

Live-action

References

External links
 
 
 

Living people
20th-century American male actors
21st-century American male actors
American male film actors
American male stage actors
American male television actors
American male video game actors
American male voice actors
Year of birth missing (living people)